Blacula is a 1972 American blaxploitation vampire horror film directed by William Crain. It stars William Marshall in the title role about an 18th-century African prince named Mamuwalde, who is turned into a vampire (and later locked in a coffin) by Count Dracula in the Count's castle in Transylvania in the year 1780 after Dracula refuses to help Mamuwalde suppress the slave trade.

Blacula was released to mixed reviews in the United States, but was one of the top-grossing films of the year. It was the first film to receive an award for Best Horror Film at the Saturn Awards. Blacula was followed by the sequel Scream Blacula Scream in 1973 and inspired a wave of blaxploitation-themed horror films.

Plot
In 1780, African prince Mamuwalde goes to Transylvania to seek the help of Count Dracula in suppressing the slave trade. Dracula refuses, however, and insults Mamuwalde by making a pass at his wife, Luva. After a scuffle with Dracula's minions, Mamuwalde is bitten by Dracula and transformed into a vampire. Dracula then curses him with the name "Blacula" and imprisons him in a sealed coffin in a crypt hidden beneath the castle while leaving Luva to die in the chamber with Blacula.

In 1972, two gay interior decorators, Bobby McCoy and Billy Schaffer, purchase the coffin and ship it to Los Angeles. Bobby and Billy open the coffin, only to become Blacula's first victims.  At the funeral home where McCoy's body is laid, Blacula spies on mourning friends Tina Williams, her sister Michelle, and Michelle's boyfriend, Dr. Gordon Thomas, a pathologist for the Los Angeles Police Department. Blacula becomes obsessed with Tina, believing her to be the reincarnation of Luva due to her having an identical resemblance to the latter. Thomas notices oddities with McCoy's death that he later concludes to be consistent with vampire folklore. Blacula follows Tina after leaving the funeral home but unintentionally frightens her. Tina runs away from him, and Blacula loses her when he is hit by a cab. He then kills the cabbie, Juanita Jones, turning her into a vampire.

Thomas, Michelle, and Tina celebrate Michelle's birthday at a nightclub, and Blacula shows up to return Tina's purse she dropped the night before. Thomas answers a phone call from the funeral director, who informs him that McCoy's body has gone missing. Blacula asks Tina to see him again the following evening, but they are interrupted by Nancy, a photographer who takes a photograph of them together. Soon after, Blacula kills Nancy and destroys the photo she just developed, which shows Blacula conspicuously absent. The next evening, Blacula visits Tina at her apartment and shares how Dracula enslaved him and Luva and how he was cursed with vampirism. He and Tina then spend the night together.

Thomas, Lt. Jack Peters, and Michelle are meanwhile following the trail of murder victims, as Thomas begins to suspect a vampire of being the perpetrator. After Thomas digs up Schaffer's coffin, the corpse rises as a vampire and attacks Thomas, who fends him off and drives a stake through his heart. Thomas calls the morgue and alerts Sam, the attendant, to take Jones' body out of deep freeze and leave. Sam rolls her body out but neglects to lock the door. Jones rises and immediately attacks and kills him. Thomas and Peters arrive at the morgue to find blood smeared on the corridor wall near the payphone where Sam answered the call, but no sign of Sam himself. They walk into the exam room by the freezer, where Peters sees a sheet-covered body lying on a gurney and pulls the sheet back to reveal Jones rising to attack him. Thomas keeps her at bay with a Christian cross long enough to open the window blinds and expose her to sunlight, destroying her.

That evening, Thomas, Michelle, and Tina are enjoying drinks at the club when Blacula arrives to pick Tina up. Thomas questions Blacula about vampires and makes it known that the police are planning a search for the vampire's coffin, provoking an uncomfortable Blacula and Tina to leave. Soon after, Thomas searches Nancy's house and finds a photo negative of Tina standing in front of the invisible Blacula. He correctly deduces that Blacula is the vampire they seek and that Blacula and Tina are still together. Thomas rushes to Tina's apartment, finding them embracing. Thomas and Blacula briefly struggle, but Blacula knocks Thomas unconscious and flees, killing a police officer in a nearby alley as he escapes. After McCoy is seen walking the streets of Los Angeles, Thomas, Peters, and several police officers track Blacula to his hideout. They locate a nest of several vampires there, including McCoy, and destroy them, but Blacula escapes.

Blacula hypnotizes Tina into going to his new hideout at a nearby underground chemical plant while Thomas and the police pursue him. Blacula dispatches several of the officers, but one of them accidentally shoots and mortally wounds Tina. To save her life, Blacula transforms her into a vampire. Blacula fights the police, one of whom locates the coffin and alerts Thomas and Peters. However, Peters kills Tina with a stake, believing that Blacula would be in the coffin instead. Devastated and feeling he has no purpose to live after losing Luva again, Blacula commits suicide by climbing the stairs to the roof where the morning sun destroys him.

Cast

Production
Many members of the cast and crew of Blacula had worked in television. Director William Crain had directed episodes of The Mod Squad. William H. Marshall's Mamuwalde was the first black vampire to appear in film. Marshall had previously worked in stage productions and in episodes of The Man from U.N.C.L.E., The Nurses, Bonanza, Star Trek and Mannix. Thalmus Rasulala, who plays Dr. Gordon Thomas, is best known for roles in episodes of The Twilight Zone, Perry Mason and Rawhide.

Blacula was in production between late January and late March 1972. While Blacula was in its production stages, William Marshall worked with the film producers to make sure his character had some dignity. His character name was changed from Andrew Brown to Mamuwalde and his character received a background story about being an African prince who had succumbed to vampirism. Blacula  was shot on location in Los Angeles, with some scenes shot in Watts and the final scenes taken at the Hyperion Outfall Treatment Plant in Playa del Rey.

The music for Blacula is unlike that of most horror films as it features a funk soundtrack, as opposed to haunting classical music. The film's soundtrack features a score by Gene Page and contributions by the Hues Corporation and 21st Century Ltd.

Release
Blacula opened in Washington, Dallas, Seattle and Oklahoma City on August 25, 1972, and in Chicago two days later. Prior to its release, American International Pictures' marketing department wanted to ensure that black audiences would be interested in Blacula; some posters for the film included references to slavery. American International Pictures also held special promotional showings at two New York theaters; anyone wearing a flowing cape would receive free admission. Blacula was popular in America, debuting at #24 on Varietys list of top films. It eventually grossed over 1 million dollars, making it one of the highest-grossing films of 1972.

Scream Factory released the film on Blu-ray as a double feature with Scream Blacula Scream on March 2, 2015.

Reception
Blacula received mixed reviews on its initial release. Variety gave the film a positive review praising the screenplay, music and acting by William Marshall. The Chicago Reader praised the film, writing that it would leave its audience more satisfied than many other "post-Lugosi efforts". Gene Siskel of the Chicago Tribune awarded three stars out of four, calling it "well-made and quite frightening." A review from Roger Greenspun in The New York Times was negative, stating that anyone who "goes to a vampire movie expecting sense is in serious trouble, and "Blacula" offers less sense than most." In Films & Filming, a reviewer referred to the film as "totally unconvincing on every level". The Monthly Film Bulletin described the film as "a disappointing model for what promised to be an exciting new genre, the black horror film." and that apart from the introductory scene, "the film conspicuously fails to pick up on any of its theme's more interesting possibilities–cinematic or philosophical." The film was awarded the Best Horror Film title at the first Saturn Awards.

Among more recent reviews, Kim Newman of Empire gave the film two stars out of five, finding the film to be "formulaic and full of holes". Time Out gave the film a negative review, stating that it "remains a lifeless reworking of heroes versus vampires with soul music and a couple of good gags." Film4 awarded the film three and a half stars out of five, calling it "essential blaxploitation viewing." Allmovie gave the film two and a half stars out of five, noting that Blacula is "better than its campy title might lead one to believe...the film suffers from the occasional bit of awkward humor (the bits with the two homosexual interior decorators are the most squirm-inducing), but Joan Torres and Raymond Koenig's script keeps things moving at a fast clip and generates some genuine chills." The Dissolve gave the film two and a half stars, stating that "The placement of an old-fashioned, Bela Lugosi-type Dracula—albeit much, much sweatier—in a modern black neighborhood is a great idea, but the amateurish production leaves Marshall as stranded in the film as his Mamuwalde is stranded in the times."

Aftermath and influence
The box office success of Blacula sparked a wave of other Black-themed horror films. A sequel to the film titled Scream Blacula Scream was released in 1973 by American International. The film also stars William Marshall in the title role along with actress Pam Grier. American International was also planning a follow-up film titled Blackenstein, but chose to focus on Scream Blacula Scream instead. Blackenstein was eventually produced by Exclusive International Pictures.

On June 17, 2021, it was announced that a reboot was in development. The film will be a co-production between MGM, Bron Studios and Hidden Empire Film Group with Roxanne Avent producing and Deon Taylor and Micah Ranum co-writing. Taylor will also direct the film.

See also
 List of American films of 1972
 Blaxploitation
 Vampire film
 Dracula A.D. 1972

Notes

References

External links
 
 
  
 
 Official Trailer #1 on YouTube

1972 films
1972 horror films
1972 LGBT-related films
African-American horror films
American supernatural horror films
American International Pictures films
American vampire films
Blaxploitation films
Dracula films
1970s English-language films
Films about reincarnation
Films set in 1780
Films set in 1972
Films set in Los Angeles
Films shot in Los Angeles
1970s American films
Films set in Transylvania
Films about princes
Films about birthdays
Gay-related films
Fictional portrayals of the Los Angeles Police Department
Films about hypnosis
Films about sisters